Yoni Buyens (born 10 March 1988) is a Belgian professional football coach and former football midfielder who is currently an academy coach for K.V.C. Westerlo.

Career
On 21 June 2014, it was announced he had signed a one-year loan deal with Charlton Athletic

On 30 June 2015, Buyens signed with Genk on a three-year deal

In 2022, K.V.C. Westerlo announced that they had signed Buyens as an academy coach.

References

External links
 
 
 

1988 births
Living people
Belgian footballers
Belgian expatriate footballers
Lierse S.K. players
K.V. Mechelen players
Standard Liège players
Charlton Athletic F.C. players
K.R.C. Genk players
Belgian Pro League players
Challenger Pro League players
English Football League players
Expatriate footballers in England
Association football midfielders
Lierse Kempenzonen players
People from Duffel
Footballers from Antwerp Province